Nangal Bakra Mazdoor Sangh is a trade union in Punjab, India, affiliated to the Indian National Trade Union Congress, organizing workers of the Bhakra Beas Management Board.

NBMS became the recognized trade union at BMBB in 2001.

Trade unions in India
Indian National Trade Union Congress
Trade unions in Bhakra Beas Management Board